Dipl.-Ing. Friedrich Kittel (19 December 1896 – 24 March 1973) was a highly decorated Generalleutnant in the Wehrmacht during World War II. He was also a recipient of the Knight's Cross of the Iron Cross. The Knight's Cross of the Iron Cross was awarded to recognise extreme battlefield bravery or successful military leadership. Friedrich Kittel was captured by American troops in May 1945 and was released in 1947.

Awards and decorations
 Iron Cross (1914)
 2nd Class
 1st Class
 Wound Badge (1914)
 in Black
 Honour Cross of the World War 1914/1918
 Iron Cross (1939)
 2nd Class
 1st Class
 German Cross in Gold (1 April 1942)
 Knight's Cross of the Iron Cross on 9 January 1945 as Generalmajor and commander of 62. Volksgrenadier-Division

Notes

References

Citations

Bibliography

External links
Lexikon der Wehrmacht
TracesOfWar.com

1896 births
1973 deaths
People from Gerolzhofen
People from the Kingdom of Bavaria
German Army personnel of World War I
Military personnel from Bavaria
Recipients of the clasp to the Iron Cross, 1st class
Recipients of the Gold German Cross
Recipients of the Knight's Cross of the Iron Cross
German prisoners of war in World War II held by the United States
Lieutenant generals of the German Army (Wehrmacht)